Dibasic may refer to:

 Dibasic, or diprotic acid, an acid containing two potential protons to donate
 Dibasic salt, a salt with two hydrogen atoms, with respect to the parent acid, replaced by cations
 Dibasic ester, an ester of a dicarboxylic acid

See also

Monobasic (disambiguation)
Tribasic (disambiguation)
Polybasic (disambiguation)